Milštejn are the remaining ruins of a castle in the north of the Czech Republic. The ruins are located in the Lusatian Mountains at an altitude of 562 m, about 3.5 km north from the town of Cvikov. The exact date when the castle was built is unknown. Based on the surrounding sites, it is assumed that the castle was founded between the 13th and 14th centuries to protect the country trail leading from Lípa to Zittau. The first known owners of the castle were Berka of Dubá, a prominent cadet branch of a Bohemian noble family.

History
In the second half of the 13th century in the northern part of Bohemia, along the Leipzig trade route, the Lords of Warttenberg and Ronow built fortified settlements (Sloup, Vartenberk, Lemberk, Lipý, Frýdlant and others). It is documented by archaeological finds that at that time, Milštejn was built on the communication route between Sloup and Oybin.

Gallery

See also
List of castles in the Czech Republic
History of the Czech lands in the Middle Ages

References

Castles in the Liberec Region
Česká Lípa District
Gothic architecture in the Czech Republic